Pellaea nana, known as dwarf sickle fern, is a fern species in the subfamily Cheilanthoideae of the family Pteridaceae.  It grows in eastern Australia, in rainforest or moist eucalyptus forest, often on rocks, cliffs and large boulders. Also found growing on Lord Howe Island. The original specimen was collected by Allan Cunningham at the Brisbane River. In the state of Victoria, this plant is considered rare. The specific epithet nana is derived from the Latin word nanus meaning dwarf (it is a small plant).

The fronds are usually 20 to 50 cm long. Each frond has between 25 and 65 leaflets. These pinnae (fern leaflets) have a short stalk or no stalk, oblong to narrow-oblong in shape. Each pinna is 25 mm long and 2.5 to 7 cm wide. The fronds are dark green, paler below. The sori are about 1 mm wide.

References

nana
Flora of New South Wales
Flora of Queensland
Flora of Lord Howe Island
Flora of Tasmania
Flora of Victoria (Australia)